The Pikes Peak Highway is a  toll road that runs from Cascade, Colorado to the summit of Pikes Peak in El Paso County, at an altitude of .  It is at least partially open year-round, up to the altitude where snow removal becomes excessively difficult.

The rate structure varies depending on time of year and ranges from $10 per adult and $5 per child throughout winter up to $50 per carload (5 passengers or fewer) with discounts on additional passengers.

Highway
The Pikes Peak Highway was constructed in 1915 and financed by Spencer Penrose at a cost of $500,000.

An earlier road up the mountain, the Pike's Peak Carriage Road, dates back to 1888. Thousands of tourists traveled along the Pikes Peak Carriage Road up to Pikes Peak's summit. It was opened by the Cascade Town Company in 1888 and closed in 1902.

Maintenance
It was maintained by Colorado DOT as Colorado State Highway 250 from 1939 until 1947. Today, the road is maintained by the city of Colorado Springs.

Races
The highway has been home to an annual automobile and motorcycle race called the Pikes Peak International Hillclimb since 1916.

Another race is the Pikes Peak Cycling Hill Climb (formerly Assault on the Peak), first held in 2010. The 2016 edition was also the first edition of the USA Cycling Hill Climb National Championship.

Environmental damage claim
Litigation was pursued by the Sierra Club in 1998-1999, on grounds of environmental damage from the gravel portion of the road. Pursuant to the settlement agreed by the Sierra Club and the City of Colorado Springs, the unpaved portion of the Pikes Peak Highway became a hard-surface road, despite concerns that such a project would radically change the nature of the annual automobile and motorcycle race. The paving project was completed on October 1, 2011.

Pike's Peak Hill Climb champion Rod Millen warned that paving the road would put an end to the race. However, the race went ahead normally in 2012 and has continued ever since.

See also
Colorado Springs, Colorado
Southern Rocky Mountains
Mountain peaks of Colorado
Pikes Peak

References

External links
  Official website by the City of Colorado Springs
  The Pikes Peak Web site
  M.E.Salek "Roads of Colorado"

Pikes Peak
Toll roads in Colorado
Tourist attractions in El Paso County, Colorado
Transportation in El Paso County, Colorado